Mamadou Tall (born 4 December 1982) is a former Burkinabé football player.

He was part of the Burkinabé 2002 African Nations Cup team, who finished bottom of group B in the first round of competition, thus failing to secure qualification for the quarter-finals.

Club career
He moved to Persepolis in summer 2011 from União Leiria and was used as centre back. He played on the Burkina Faso national football team and was a starter.

Club career statistics
Last update:  1 May 2012 

 Assist Goals

External links
 
 
 
 Mamadou Tall at PersianLeague.com

Burkinabé expatriate sportspeople in Algeria
Burkinabé footballers
Burkina Faso international footballers
Burkinabé expatriate footballers
Expatriate footballers in Portugal
CS Grevenmacher players
USM Blida players
C.F. União players
Bursaspor footballers
Wydad AC players
CS Sfaxien players
1982 births
Living people
Expatriate footballers in Turkey
Expatriate footballers in Tunisia
Expatriate footballers in Morocco
Étoile Filante de Ouagadougou players
Expatriate footballers in Luxembourg
Expatriate footballers in Algeria
Expatriate footballers in Iran
Persepolis F.C. players
Süper Lig players
Primeira Liga players
2002 African Cup of Nations players
2010 Africa Cup of Nations players
2012 Africa Cup of Nations players
Association football defenders
Santos FC Ouagadougou footballers
21st-century Burkinabé people